Quaternary is an EP by the heavy metal band Mötley Crüe. It was released in 1994 on Elektra. The EP, which was initially going to be titled Leftovers, was made available as a mail-in offer for purchasers of the self-titled album in a limited quantity of 20,000 copies.

Background
The EP features one song from each member of the band ("Planet Boom" by Tommy Lee, "Bittersuite" by Mick Mars, "Father" by Nikki Sixx, and "Friends" by John Corabi), along with the song "Babykills" which is performed by the entire band.

Songs 1–3 and 7 were reissued on the Supersonic and Demonic Relics compilation in 1999. Songs 1–2 were featured on the Red, White & Crüe compilation in 2005, and all the tracks were made available on the Music to Crash Your Car To: Vol. 2 box set in 2004.

The rap metal-influenced "Planet Boom" was later released on the soundtrack for Tommy Lee's then-wife Pamela Anderson's movie Barb Wire. However, the song was remade, credited to Tommy Lee only, and the title was changed to "Welcome to Planet Boom". A music video was also released for the song around the same time as the film's release.

Track listing

Credits
John Corabi – lead vocals, rhythm guitar, piano, backing vocals
Mick Mars – lead guitar, rhythm guitar, backing vocals
Nikki Sixx – bass guitar, lead vocals on "Father", backing vocals
Tommy Lee – drums, percussion, synthesizer, lead vocals on "Planet Boom", backing vocals

References

Mötley Crüe EPs
1994 EPs
Elektra Records EPs
Alternative metal EPs